Verni is a Wielingen-class frigate of the Bulgarian Navy. She was originally commissioned as Wielingen in the Belgian Navy.

Construction and career

Wielingen was launched on 30 March 1976 at the Boelwerf in Temse, and christened by Queen Fabiola of Belgium, on 20 January 1978. The patronage of the Wielingen was accepted by the city of Malmedy. Wielingen was the first ship in the Wielingen class, and had the pennant number F910.

The ship was sold to the Bulgarian Navy and left the Zeebrugge Naval Base in February 2009 under the Bulgarian flag. She was renamed Verni, with the new pennant number 42.

Wielingen-class frigates
1976 ships
Wielingen-class frigates of the Bulgarian Navy
Ships built in Belgium
Frigates of the Cold War